Page County Bridge No. 1990, also known as Overall Bridge, is a historic Pratt deck arch truss bridge located at Overall, Page County, Virginia. It was built in 1938, and is a single-span Pratt deck arch metal truss bridge with four "T"-beam concrete approach spans. It is approximately 123 feet long and the entire bridge length is approximately 245 feet.

It was listed on the National Register of Historic Places in 2008.

References

Road bridges on the National Register of Historic Places in Virginia
Bridges completed in 1938
Buildings and structures in Page County, Virginia
National Register of Historic Places in Page County, Virginia
Metal bridges in the United States
Truss bridges in the United States
Arch bridges in the United States